Estación de Tudela de Navarra is a railway and bus station in the Spanish city of Tudela in the autonomous region of Navarre.

It was first opened in May 1861.

References

External links
 Larga Distancia in the website of Renfe.
 Media Distancia Navarra in the website of Renfe.

Railway stations in Navarre
Railway stations in Spain opened in 1861